Renate Sigl (born 18 February 1950) is an Austrian rower. She competed in the women's double sculls event at the 1976 Summer Olympics.

References

External links
 

1950 births
Living people
Austrian female rowers
Olympic rowers of Austria
Rowers at the 1976 Summer Olympics
Rowers from Linz